LeRoux (also known as Louisiana's LeRoux) is a band founded in Baton Rouge, Louisiana, which saw its heyday from 1978 to 1984. Their best-known songs were "Take a Ride On a Riverboat" with its 4-part a capella intro, the regional smash "New Orleans Ladies", "Nobody Said It Was Easy (Lookin' for the Lights)" (their highest-charting single), "Addicted" and "Carrie's Gone". 

The band continued to perform live throughout the U.S., mostly at fairs and festivals in the Louisiana area.

Band history

Rise to fame (1977–1984) 
In 1977, several former members of a group called the Levee Band, who had been playing as studio players in the Bayou-located Studio in the Country and as backup for local artists like Clarence "Gatemouth" Brown and Clifton Chenier, signed a deal with Capitol Records as The Jeff Pollard Band. The band had just returned from touring the United States and Africa with Brown through an arrangement with the US State Department. Leon Medica, the band's producer and bassist, had presented a demo tape to Paul Tannen at Screen Gems-EMI while doing a session in Nashville and making trips to Colorado to contribute bass parts to a Nitty Gritty Dirt Band album at William McEuen's Aspen Recording Society studios. McEuen, Tannen and Attorney John Frankenheimer helped Medica secure the contract with Capitol.

By early 1978, they had changed their name to Louisiana's LeRoux, which refers to roux, a Cajun gravy base used to make gumbo. The band was originally composed of Jeff Pollard (vocals, guitar), David Peters (drums, percussion, backing vocals), Leon Medica (bass, backing vocals), Tony Haselden (vocals, guitar), Rod Roddy (vocals, keyboards, synthesizers) and Bobby Campo (horns, percussion, violin, backing vocals). All of the songs on their self-titled 1978 debut album were sung and written by Pollard, except "New Orleans Ladies", which was written by Hoyt Garrick with a contribution by Medica. It reached No. 59 on the Billboard Hot 100 in the summer of 1978. Two more albums followed (Keep the Fire Burnin in June 1979 and Up in June 1980), but after neither was able to expand the band's fan base, they were dropped by Capitol.

During the height of their popularity, LeRoux performed on Solid Gold, The Midnight Special and Don Kirshner's Rock Concert (the late-night television music shows that were popular at that time). They also appeared with many classic rock bands, including: The Allman Brothers Band, Wet Willie, Journey, Kansas, Heart, The Doobie Brothers, Charlie Daniels Band, Foreigner, Marshall Tucker Band, Outlaws, ZZ Top and more. 

Starting with the Jai Winding-produced Up, they moved away from their more funky R&B sound towards a more late-70s/early-80s album-oriented rock style and dropped "Louisiana's" from their name, becoming simply "LeRoux". In 1981, they signed with RCA and issued their fourth LP, Last Safe Place (January 1982), which became their highest-charting album. The album spawned three charting Billboard singles in 1982: "Addicted" (No. 8 Mainstream Rock), "Nobody Said It Was Easy (Lookin' for the Lights)" (No. 18 Hot 100) and "Last Safe Place on Earth" (No. 77 Hot 100).

Other changes were in store as Campo and Pollard both quit later that year, with the former returning to school to complete his master's degree in music and the latter renouncing rock music to enter the Baptist Christian ministry, where he remains today. Former Trillion singer Fergie Frederiksen and guitarist Jim Odom (a local native, who had just attended Berklee College of Music) came on board in the summer of 1982, taking over for Pollard on the fifth album, So Fired Up (which was released in February 1983). The album contained the minor-charting "Carrie's Gone" (No. 79 Hot 100), which Odom and Frederiksen had written after Frederiksen's breakup with actress Carrie Hamilton, Carol Burnett's daughter. The music video for the album's second single "Lifeline" also received MTV rotation, and was covered by Bobby and the Midnites and Uriah Heep. "Wait One Minute", another song from this album, was widely aired and favored by fans. Some young people know the band mainly for this beautiful ballad.

It wasn't enough to keep them from being dropped by RCA, however, and the band called it quits by 1984. Frederiksen, who had already been working with another project called Abandon Shame, then stepped in to replace (former Levee Band member) Bobby Kimball in the band Toto.

Later years (1985-present) 
In March 1985 Leon Medica and Tony Haselden were part of a USO organized traveling rock outfit that entertained US military troops in Europe, called 1st Airborne Division Rock and Roll. Later in 1985, most of the band (sans Pollard & Frederiksen) got back together to do annual concerts in and around New Orleans with new singer Randy Knapps. Peters and Odom were also part of the group Network, who recorded the song "Back in America" for the movie European Vacation that came out that same year.

Medica and Knapps were part of another edition of 1st Airborne Division Rock and Roll that went to the Indian Ocean and Europe in September through October 1986. After releasing a greatest hits compilation entitled Bayou Degradable: The Best of Louisiana's LeRoux in July 1996, the band decided to play more live shows in the southern U.S. and along the Gulf Coast and have been doing so ever since.

By 1997, new members Kenneth J. "Boo" Pourciau (drums, backing vocals), Nelson Blanchard (keyboards, backing vocals) and Steve Brewster (percussion) came in to sub for Peters, Roddy and Campo, whenever the increased tour schedule conflicted with their other duties. Shortly thereafter, Campo left the band again and Mark Duthu replaced Brewster later that year. 

In 2000 the newer members appeared alongside Knapps, Haselden, Medica, Peters, Odom and Roddy on a new release, Ain't Nothing but a Gris Gris.  The CD, which was a return to the funkier sound of the band's first two albums, featured ten tracks – "all written or co-written by members of LeRoux",  according to the back cover. The CD was produced by Medica with Odom credited as an Associate Producer.

Knapps left the group at the end of 2005 and Courtney Westbrook was lead singer in 2006 before Terry Brock (formerly of Network) took over in 2007. After the group's heyday, guitarist Tony Haselden became a Nashville songwriter in the late-1980s and penned the country hits "It Ain't Nothin'" for the late Keith Whitley, "That's My Story" for Collin Raye, "Mama Knows" for the group Shenandoah and many others. Bassist and producer Leon Medica resides in Nashville and is in high demand as a studio musician and songwriter.

Members of LeRoux backed up Tab Benoit on his Brother to the Blues and Power of the Ponchartrain CDs, recorded a live DVD and CD in Nashville with Tab in early May 2007 and toured nationwide with him in 2007 and 2008. On October 10, 2009, during their performance at Tab Benoit's "Voice of the Wetlands" Festival in Houma, Louisiana, LeRoux was inducted into the Louisiana Music Hall of Fame as their 50th inductee.

In 2010, Terry Brock was replaced as lead singer by Keith Landry and David Peters was replaced by new drummer Randy Carpenter. LeRoux went back into Dockside Studio in May 2011 to record basic tracks for an album slated for release in 2012. This project included such diverse vocalists and musicians as Bobby Kimball, Steve Cropper, Jimmy Hall and Sonny Landreth, was never released since the group felt the tracks "lacked chemistry."

At the end of 2014, Leon Medica retired from live performing. His place onstage in LeRoux has been assumed by new bassist Joey Decker. In early 2016, Terry Brock returned as the band's lead singer for another two years. In March 2018, after Brock once again departed, Jeff McCarty was announced as LeRoux's new lead singer. Right around the same time, the group began work on a new album with producer Jeff Glixman. This album, One of Those Days, was released in June 2020.

Personnel

Members 

Current members
 Tony Haselden – vocals, guitars (1978–1984, 1985–present)
 Rod Roddy – vocals, keyboards, synthesizers (1978–1984, 1985–present)
 Jim Odom – guitars, backing vocals (1982–1984, 1985–present)
 Nelson Blanchard – keyboards, backing vocals (1997–present)
 Mark Duthu – percussion (1997-present)
 Randy Carpenter – drums (2010–present)
 Jeff McCarty – vocals (2018–present)
 Joey Decker – bass, backing vocals (2014–present)

Former members
 Leon Medica – bass, backing vocals (1978–1984, 1985–2014)
 David Peters – drums, percussion, backing vocals (1978–1984, 1985–2010)
 Bobby Campo – horns, percussion, violin, backing vocals (1978–1982, 1985–1997)
 Boo Pourciau – drums, backing vocals (1997–2003; died 2003)
 Jeff Pollard – vocals, guitars (1978–1982)
 Fergie Frederiksen – vocals (1982–1984; died 2014)
 Randy Knapps – vocals (1985–2005)
 Steve Brewster - percussion (1997)
 Courtney Westbrook – vocals (2006–2007)
 Terry Brock – vocals (2007–2010, 2016-2018)
 Keith Landry – vocals (2010–2016)

Lineups

Discography

Albums

Singles

References

External links
 

Louisiana's LeRoux
Musical groups from Baton Rouge, Louisiana